Percy Dwight Outram (19 May 1903 – 3 November 1981) was an Australian rules footballer who played with Carlton and St Kilda in the Victorian Football League (VFL).

Brother of former Collingwood and Richmond player, Roy Outram.

Notes

External links 

Percy Outram's profile at Blueseum

1903 births
1981 deaths
Carlton Football Club players
St Kilda Football Club players
Kyabram Football Club players
Australian rules footballers from Victoria (Australia)
People educated at Wesley College (Victoria)